Silicon Photonics Link is a silicon-based optical data connection developed by Intel Corporation which uses silicon photonics and hybrid silicon laser, it provides 50 Gbit/s bandwidth. Intel expected the technology to be in products by 2015.

This technology is enabled and well supported by academic and industrial research work at Intel labs, 50 Gbit/s multi-color transmission line at Cornell University and Columbia University.

See also 
 List of device bandwidths
 Thunderbolt (Light Peak)
 Universal Serial Bus (USB)

References

External links 
 The 50G Silicon Photonics Link
 http://www.intel.com/content/www/us/en/research/intel-labs-silicon-photonics-research.html
 http://www.intel.com/content/www/us/en/data-center/silicon-photonics-research.html

Computer buses
Intel products
Silicon photonics